The 1970–71 season was the 72nd completed season of The Football League.

Arsenal won the league championship at the home of their North London rivals, Tottenham Hotspur, with Ray Kennedy scoring the winner. This would soon be followed by their FA Cup final tie with Liverpool. They narrowly overcame Leeds to win the league, with a 12-point gap separating Leeds United from third-placed Tottenham. Wolves and Liverpool joined these two teams in the UEFA Cup. Chelsea missed out on the top five on goal average but compensated for this shortcoming by beating Real Madrid in the European Cup Winners' Cup.

Burnley and Blackpool (who won this year's Anglo-Italian Cup) were relegated to the Second Division. Burnley returned from 1973/74 to 1975/76 but it took Blackpool until the 2009–10 season to regain their top flight status after a 3–2 victory over Cardiff City in the Playoff Final (only to be relegated back after the 2010–11 season).

Wilf McGuinness was sacked after 18 unsuccessful months as manager of Manchester United. Sir Matt Busby was re-appointed as manager on a temporary basis, but never considered returning to his old job on a permanent basis. Leicester City manager Frank O'Farrell was appointed at the end of the season.

Leicester City and Sheffield United were promoted to the First Division. Blackburn Rovers and Bolton Wanderers, two of the most famous and historic names in English football, were relegated to the Third Division.

Preston North End and Fulham finally had something to shout about by getting promoted to the Second Division. Halifax Town achieved its best ever league position, missing out on the Second Division by one place. Reading, Bury, Doncaster Rovers and Gillingham slid into the Fourth Division.

Notts County, Bournemouth & Boscombe Athletic, Oldham Athletic and York City were promoted to the Third Division. The Football League voted for the league's four bottom clubs to maintain their status.

Final league tables and results
Beginning with the season 1894–95, clubs finishing level on points were separated according to goal average (goals scored divided by goals conceded), or more properly put, goal ratio. In case one or more teams had the same goal difference, this system favoured those teams who had scored fewer goals. The goal average system was eventually scrapped beginning with the 1976–77 season.

Since the Fourth Division was established in the 1958–59 season, the bottom four teams of that division have been required to apply for re-election.

First Division

Results

Maps

Top scorers
Goalscorers are listed order of total goals, then according to the number of league goals, then of FA cup goals, then of League Cup goals. A dash means the team of the player in question did not participate in European competitions.

The goals listed below in the European fields stem from the following competitions:
Everton participated in the 1970–71 European Cup.
Manchester City participated in the 1970–71 European Cup Winners' Cup.
 Arsenal, Coventry City, Leeds United (winners), Liverpool, and Newcastle United participated in the 1970–71 Inter-Cities Fairs Cup.
 Burnley, Nottingham Forest, Stoke City, Tottenham Hotspur, West Bromwich Albion, and Wolverhampton Wanderers participated in the 1970–71 Texaco Cup.

Second Division

Results

Maps

Top scorers
Goalscorers are listed order of total goals, then according to the number of league goals, then of FA cup goals, then of League Cup goals. A dash means the team of the player in question did not participate in European competitions.

Cardiff City scored a total of 15 goals in the 1970–71 European Cup Winners' Cup, but John Toshack’s 6 goals are given in the listingfor First Division topscorers by Rothmans. The other 9 goals were distributed between six other players, none of whom made this listing.

Third Division

Results

Maps

Top scorers
Goalscorers are listed order of total goals, then according to the number of league goals, then of FA cup goals, then of League Cup goals. A dash means the team of the player in question did not participate in European competitions.

Fourth Division

Results

Maps

Top scorers
Goalscorers are listed order of total goals, then according to the number of league goals, then of FA cup goals, then of League Cup goals. A dash means the team of the player in question did not participate in European competitions.

{| class="wikitable" style="text-align: center;"
!width=45|Rank
!width=160|Scorer
!width=250|Club
!width=50|League goals
!width=50|FA Cup goals
!width=50|League Cup goals
!width=50|Total
|-
|1||align=left|   Ted MacDougall ||align=left| Bournemouth & Boscombe Athletic ||42||7||0||49
|-
|2||align=left|  Ray Crawford ||align=left| Colchester United ||25||7||0||32
|-
|3||align=left|  Paul Aimson ||align=left| York City ||26||5||0||31
|-
|4||align=left|  Jim Fryatt ||align=left| Oldham Athletic ||24||0||2||26
|-
|5||align=left|  Jack Howarth ||align=left| Aldershot ||21||3||1||25
|-
|6||align=left|  Phil Boyer ||align=left| Bournemouth & Boscombe Athletic / York City ||11 + 9||0 + 1||0 + 3||24
|-
|7||align=left|  David Shaw<ref group="notes2">Rothmans apparently has an error in the goals of David Shaw, but it is not possible to identify the error clearly.</ref> ||align=left| Oldham Athletic ||23||0||0||23 
|-
|8||align=left|  Tony Hateley ||align=left| Notts County ||22||1||0||23
|-
|9||align=left|  Pat Morrissey ||align=left| Crewe Alexandra ||20||1||1||22
|-
|10||align=left|  Billy Best ||align=left| Southend United ||19||3||0||22
|-
|11||align=left|  Alan Banks ||align=left| Exeter City ||21||0||0||21
|-
|12||align=left|  Phil Hubbard ||align=left| Lincoln City ||18||1||0||19
|-
|13||align=left|  Joe Gadston ||align=left| Exeter City ||18||0||1||19
|-
|14||align=left|  Colin Garwood ||align=left| Peterborough United ||17||1||0||18
|-
|=||align=left|  Alan Harding ||align=left| Darlington ||17||1||0||18
|-
|16||align=left|  John Fairbrother ||align=left| Northampton Town ||15||1||2||18
|-
|17||align=left|  Bobby Svarc ||align=left| Lincoln City / Barrow ||11 + 3 ||4||0||18
|-
|18||align=left|  Ivan Hollett ||align=left| Cambridge United / Crewe Alexandra ||11 + 6||0||0||17
|-
|19||align=left|  Alan Tarbuck ||align=left| Chester ||16||1||0||17
|-
|=||align=left|  Sammy McMillan ||align=left| Stockport County ||16||1||0||17
|-
|=||align=left|  Eddie Loyden ||align=left| Chester ||16||1||0||17
|-
|22||align=left|  Bobby Ross ||align=left| Brentford ||15||1||0||16
|-
|23||align=left|  Allan Gauden ||align=left| Darlington ||13||2||1||16
|-
|24||align=left|  Derek Trevis ||align=left| Lincoln City ||13||1||2||16
|-
|25||align=left|  Percy Freeman ||align=left| Lincoln City ||10||4||2||16
|-
|26||align=left|  Dennis Brown ||align=left| Aldershot ||14||1||0||15
|-
|=||align=left|  Roger Cross ||align=left| Brentford ||14||1||0||15
|-
|28||align=left|  Fred Large ||align=left| Northampton Town ||14||0||1||15
|-
|29||align=left|  Willie Brown ||align=left| Newport County ||13||0||2||15
|-
|30||align=left|  Don Masson ||align=left| Notts County ||14||0||0||14
|-
|=||align=left|  Eddie Garbett ||align=left| Barrow ||14||0||0||14
|-
|32||align=left|  Alan McNeill ||align=left| Oldham Athletic ||13||1||0||14
|-
|=||align=left|  Kevin McMahon ||align=left| York City ||13||1||0||14
|-
|=||align=left|  Peter Graham ||align=left| Darlington ||13||1||0||14
|-
|=||align=left|  Stan Bowles ||align=left| Crewe Alexandra ||13||1||0||14
|-
|36||align=left|  Richie Barker ||align=left| Notts County ||13||0||0||13
|-
|37||align=left|  Bob Moss ||align=left| Peterborough United ||11||2||0||13
|-
|38||align=left|  John Docherty ||align=left| Brentford ||10||3||0||13
|-
|39||align=left|  Tommy Robson ||align=left| Peterborough United ||12||0||0||12
|-
|=||align=left|  Eric Redrobe ||align=left| Southport ||12||0||0||12
|-
|41||align=left|  Nigel Cassidy ||align=left| Oxford United / Scunthorpe United ||4 + 7||1||0||12
|-
|42||align=left|  Charlie Crickmore ||align=left| Notts County ||10||2||0||12
|-
|43||align=left|  Bill Garner ||align=left| Southend United ||8||4||0||12
|-
|44||align=left|  Les Bradd ||align=left| Notts County ||11||0||0||11
|-
|=||align=left|  Terry Heath ||align=left| Scunthorpe United ||11||0||0||11
|-
|=||align=left|  Jim Irvine ||align=left| Barrow ||11||0||0||11
|-
|=||align=left|  Matt Tees ||align=left| Grimsby Town / Luton Town ||9 + 2||0||0||11
|-
|48||align=left|  Jim Hall ||align=left| Peterborough United ||10||1||0||11
|-
|=||align=left|  Keith Webber ||align=left| Chester ||10||1||0||11
|-
|50||align=left|  Tommy Bryceland ||align=left| Oldham Athletic ||10||0||1||11
|-
|=||align=left|  Kevin Keegan ||align=left| Scunthorpe United ||10||0||1||11
|-
|52||align=left|  Stuart Brace ||align=left| Grimsby Town ||10||0||0||10
|-
|=||align=left|  Alan Bradshaw ||align=left| Crewe Alexandra ||10||0||0||10
|-
|54||align=left|  Rod Jones ||align=left| Newport County ||9||1||0||10
|-
|=||align=left|  Eddie Rowles||align=left| Bournemouth & Boscombe Athletic ||9||1||0||10
|-
|56||align=left|  Keith Bebbington ||align=left| Oldham Athletic ||9||0||1||10
|-
|57||align=left|  Tommy Spratt ||align=left| Workington ||8||2||0||10
|}

See also
 1970-71 in English football

References

Ian Laschke: Rothmans Book of Football League Records 1888–89 to 1978–79''. Macdonald and Jane’s, London & Sydney, 1980.

External links
 Season 1970-71 complete complete lineups, tables and squads at Historical Football Lineups

 
English Football League seasons